Diplotriaenidae is a family of spirurian nematodes. Like all their relatives, they have neither a circulatory a or respiratory system. They are the only family in superfamily Diplotriaenoidea, if the Oswaldofilariidae are correctly placed with the Filarioidea and not here.

Systematics 
Subfamilies and genera of Diplotriaenidae are:

Subfamily Diplotriaeninae
Quadriplotriaena
Diplotriaena - includes Diplotriaenoides
Chabaudiella
Subfamily Dicheilonematinae
Monopetalonema - includes Politospiculum and Ornithosetaria
Petrovifilaria
Dicheilonema - includes Contortospiculum
Hastospiculum  - includes Setarospiculum
Hamatospiculum - includes Parhamatospiculum, Tytofilaria, Oceanifilaria
Serratospiculum
Heterospiculum - includes Heterospiculoides
Serratospiculoides

References 

Spirurida
Nematode families